Dāllar (Persian: دلار) or namak sabz (Persian: نمک سبز) is a condiment from Northern Iran, specifically from the Gilan Province. It is made of herbs such as cilantro, parsley and basil and is heavily salted in order to stay preserved for a longer period. It is usually spread on fresh fruits or vegetables, such as unripe green plums (Persian: گوجه سبز) and cucumbers. Darrár is also mixed in salad dressings or mixed with olives, garlic or pomegranates.

Iranian cuisine
Condiments